Manfred Schoof (born 6 April 1936) is a German jazz trumpeter.

Career
Schoof was born in Magdeburg, Germany, and studied music in Kassel and Cologne, where one of his teachers of the big band leader Kurt Edelhagen. Schoof performed on Edelhagen's radio program and toured with Gunter Hampel. In the 1960s he started a free jazz band with Alexander von Schlippenbach and Gerd Dudek which became the basis for Manfred Schoof Orchestra. From 1969 to 1971 he was a member of the George Russell Orchestra. He has also worked with Jasper Van't Hof and the Globe Unity Orchestra. He composed classical music for Berlin Philharmonic. His group has participated in performances of Die Soldaten, an operatic work by the contemporary composer Bernd Alois Zimmermann.   He was featured in a profile on composer Graham Collier in the 1985 Channel 4 documentary 'Hoarded Dreams' 

Since 2007 he has been chairman of the Union Deutscher Jazzmusiker. He has been a professor in Cologne since 1990.

Discography

As leader
 Voices (CBS, 1966)
 Manfred Schoof Sextet (Wergo, 1967)
 European Echoes (FMP, 1969)
 Distant Thunder (Enja, 1975)
 Scales (ECM, 1976)
 Light Lines (Japo, 1978)
 The Early Quintet (FMP, 1978)
 Horns with Gunter Christmann, Albert Mangelsdorff (FMP, 1979)
 Horizons (Japo, 1980)
 Mal Waldron/Manfred Schoof (Amiga, 1980)
 Reflections (Mood, 1984)
 Power Station (UBM, 1984)
 Meditation (UBM, 1987)
 Shadows & Smiles (Wergo, 1989)
 Timebreaker (UBM, 1990)
 Crossroad (UBM, 1992)

As sideman
With European Jazz Ensemble
 Live (Konnex, 1988)
 At the Philharmonic Cologne (MA Music, 1989)
 Meets the Khan Family (MA Music, 1992)
 20th Anniversary Tour (Konnex, 1997)
 30th Anniversary Tour 2006 (Konnex, 2009)

With Globe Unity Orchestra
 Live in Wuppertal (FMP, 1973)
 Der Alte Mann Bricht...Sein Schweigen (FMP, 1974)
 Bavarian Calypso/Good Bye (FMP, 1975)
 Pearls (FMP, 1977)
 Improvisations (Japo, 1978)
 Hamburg '74 (FMP, 1979)
 Compositions (Japo, 1980)
 Globe Unity 2002 (Intakt, 2003)
 Baden-Baden '75 (FMP, 2011)

With George Gruntz
 Happening Now! (Hat ART, 1988)
 First Prize  (Enja, 1989)
 Renaissance Man (TCB, 2002)

With Gunter Hampel
 Heartplants (SABA, 1965)
 Transformation (Birth, 1976)
 Jubilation (Birth, 1983)
 Legendary: The 27th of May 1997 (Birth, 1998)
 Live at Berlin Philharmonic Hall (Birth, 2014)

With Irmin Schmidt
 Filmmusik Vol. 2 (Spoon, 1981)
 Filmmusik Vol. 3 & 4 (Spoon, 1983)
 Rote Erde (Teldec, 1983)
 Musk at Dusk (WEA, 1987)

With Jasper van 't Hof
 Pili-Pili (Keytone, 1984)
 Hoomba-Hoomba (Virgin, 1985)
 Jakko (Jaro, 1987)

With Alexander von Schlippenbach
 Globe Unity (SABA, 1967)
 The Living Music (Quasar, 1969)
 Globe Unity 67 & 70 (Atavistic, 2001)
 Globe Unity 40 Years (Intakt, 2007)
 Blue Hawk (Jazzwerkstatt, 2011)
 Globe Unity 50 Years (Intakt, 2018)

With others
 Peter Brotzmann, In a State of Undress (FMP, 1989)
 Don Cherry, Actions (Philips, 1971)
 Graham Collier, Hoarded Dreams (Cuneiform, 2007)
 Wolfgang Dauner, 80 Jahre Das Jubilaumskonzert (Timba, 2017)
 Miles Davis & Quincy Jones, Live at Montreux (Warner 1991)
 Gabi Delgado-López, Mistress (Virgin, 1982)
 Dissidenten, Instinctive Traveler (Exil, 1997)
 Stan Getz, Francy Boland, Kenny Clarke/Francy Boland Big Band, Change of Scenes (Verve, 1971)
 Albert Mangelsdorff, Albert Mangelsdorff (Fabbri Editori, 1981)
 George Russell, Electronic Sonata for Souls Loved by Nature (Flying Dutchman, 1971)
 Gunter Sommer, Le Piccole Cose Live at Theater Gutersloh (Intuition, 2017)
 Gunter Baby Sommer, Peitzer Grand Mit Vieren (Jazzwerkstatt, 2009)
 Heiner Stadler, Retrospection (Tomato, 1989)
 Fredy Studer, Christy Doran, Half a Lifetime (Unit, 1994)
 Mal Waldron,  Hard Talk (Enja, 1974)
 Mal Waldron, One-Upmanship (Enja, 1977)
 Bernd Alois Zimmermann, Requiem fur Einen Jungen Dichter (Wergo, 1989)

References

External links
 FMP releases

Avant-garde jazz musicians
1936 births
Living people
German jazz trumpeters
Male trumpeters
ECM Records artists
Recipients of the Cross of the Order of Merit of the Federal Republic of Germany
21st-century trumpeters
21st-century German male musicians
German male jazz musicians
Globe Unity Orchestra members
Kenny Clarke/Francy Boland Big Band members
European Jazz Ensemble members
Atavistic Records artists
Cuneiform Records artists
FMP/Free Music Production artists